Brastavățu is a commune in Olt County, Oltenia, Romania. It is composed of two villages, Brastavățu and Crușovu.

References

Communes in Olt County
Localities in Oltenia